"Shock the Monkey" is a song by English rock musician Peter Gabriel. It was released in September 1982 as the second single from his fourth self-titled album, issued in the US under the title Security.

The song peaked at number 29 on the US Billboard Hot 100 chart and number one on the Billboard Hot Mainstream Rock Tracks chart. The song was Gabriel's first Top 40 hit in the US. In the UK, the song charted at number 58. According to AllMusic, the song has a "relentlessly repeated hook" that "sounded nothing like anything else on the radio at the time".

Billboard called it a "mysterious but infectious track...which melds synthesizers, distinctive vocal and dance rhythms to fresh effect."

Interpretation
Due to its title and the content of the video, the song is frequently assumed to be either an animal rights song or a reference to the famous experiments by Stanley Milgram described in his book Obedience to Authority. It is neither, but the Gabriel song "We Do What We're Told (Milgram's 37)" from his 1986 album So does deal directly with Milgram. Gabriel has described "Shock the Monkey" as "a love song" that examines how jealousy can release one's basic instincts; the monkey is not a literal monkey, but a metaphor for one's feelings of jealousy. Gabriel has mentioned that the song's lyrical motif was inspired by King Kong's lightning powers in the film King Kong vs. Godzilla.

Music video
The track is known for its bizarre and disturbing music video, written and directed by Brian Grant of MGMM Studios. The video was played heavily in the early days of MTV. It features Gabriel (in white face paint) and a frightened-looking capuchin monkey. Gabriel appears in two guises; one is as a businessman/CIA-MK-Ultra-type in a dark suit, and the other as a "modern primitive" shaman painted and dressed in white with geometric markings in black on his face. The video cuts between two rooms, each vaguely resembling an office. A movie projector plays zoo footage of a gibbon (technically, a lesser ape, not a monkey) in both rooms. As the video proceeds, events in the 'normal' (black suit) office become increasingly irregular and disturbing with objects in the room in increasing disarray. Gabriel displays increasing pressure, anger, and fear as the chaos occurs, at one point being restrained by three little people. The office footage is increasingly interspersed with black-and-white footage of Gabriel fleeing from something unknown in a wilderness, and a disoriented Gabriel in different settings including central London in what looks to be the office of a hospital. At the end of the video, the dark-suited Gabriel merges with the face-painted Gabriel. In the final shot, the two Gabriels' faces are superimposed over that of the gibbon.

Releases
"Shock the Monkey" was released as a 7-inch picture disc in addition to the 7-inch and 12-inch black vinyl singles. Club DJ remix service Hot Tracks crafted an 8:12 version that intersperses verses and choruses sung by Gabriel in German with the more familiar English lyrics. A seven-minute-long concert version of the song appears on Gabriel's album Plays Live (1983). It is also included on the compilation albums Greenpeace (1985), Shaking the Tree (1990) and Hit (2003). The music video appears on the DVD compilation Play (2004).

Earth Day version
On 22 April 2022, a previously-unreleased alternate mix of "Shock The Monkey" was exclusively released for download on Bandcamp under the title "Shock the Monkey (EarthPercent x Earth Day Mix)". Put out as a tribute to Earth Day 2022, proceeds from the download were donated to the environmentalist organization EarthPercent, as part of a project where Gabriel and several other artists donated exclusive and rare material.

Personnel 
 Peter Gabriel – lead and backing vocals, Linn LM-1 programming, Prophet-5, Fairlight CMI synthesizer and sequencing
 Larry Fast – Prophet-5
 David Rhodes – guitars
 Tony Levin – Chapman Stick
 Jerry Marotta – drums
 Peter Hammill – backing vocals

Remix contest
An online contest was held in September 2006 by Realworld Remixed in which musicians and engineers were invited to submit a remix of the song. The original tracks were made available for download, offering an opportunity to work with the raw material from a hit song. The winner was Multiman's "Simian Surprise".

Charts

Coal Chamber featuring Ozzy Osbourne version

The nu metal band Coal Chamber covered "Shock the Monkey" on their 1999 album Chamber Music. The cover featured guest vocals by Ozzy Osbourne. The music video was directed by Dean Karr. It shows the band playing with Osbourne and it has shots of a monkey.

Track listing

Chart positions

Personnel
Coal Chamber
 B. Dez Fafara – lead vocals
 Meegs Rascón – guitar
 Rayna Foss-Rose – bass
 Mike "Bug" Cox – drums

Additional
 Ozzy Osbourne – guest vocals
 E. Blue – keyboards, backing vocals

See also
List of number-one mainstream rock hits (United States)

References

1982 songs
1982 singles
1999 singles
British synth-pop songs
Peter Gabriel songs
Ozzy Osbourne songs
Coal Chamber songs
Songs written by Peter Gabriel
Geffen Records singles
Roadrunner Records singles
Songs about primates